Leptecophylla is a genus of flowering plants in the family Ericaceae. The genus is native to southeastern Australia, New Zealand, Papua New Guinea and the Pacific Islands. Some species in this genus were formerly classified within the genera Cyathodes, Lissanthe, Styphelia and Trochocarpa.

, Plants of the World Online accepted 12 species:
Leptecophylla abietina (Labill.) C.M.Weiller (Tasmania)
Leptecophylla brassii (Sleumer) C.M.Weiller (New Guinea)
Leptecophylla brevistyla (J.W.Moore) C.M.Weiller (Society Islands)
Leptecophylla divaricata (Hook.f.) C.M.Weiller (eastern Tasmania)
Leptecophylla juniperina (J.R.Forst. & G.Forst.) C.M.Weiller (Victoria, Tasmania and New Zealand)
Leptecophylla mariannensis (Kaneh.) C.M.Weiller (Marianas Islands)
Leptecophylla parvifolia (R.Br.) Jarman (Tasmania)
Leptecophylla pendulosa (Jarman) C.M.Weiller (northeast Tasmania)
Leptecophylla pogonocalyx C.M.Weiller (Tasmania)
Leptecophylla pomarae (A.Gray) C.M.Weiller (Tahiti)
Leptecophylla rapae (Sleumer) C.M.Weiller (Rapa Iti and Austral Islands)
Leptecophylla robusta (Hook.f.) C.M.Weiller (Chatham Islands in New Zealand)
Leptecophylla tameiameiae (Cham. & Schltdl.) C.M.Weiller (Hawaiian and Marquesas Islands)

Leptecophylla imbricata (Stschegl.) C.M.Weiller is regarded as a separate species by some sources, but as a synonym of Leptecophylla tameiameiae by others.

References

Epacridoideae
Ericaceae genera